Agatino "Tino" Parisi (born 14 June 1995) is an Italian footballer who plays as a centre back  club Piacenza.

Club career
He made his Serie B debut for Catania on 12 October 2014 in a game against Bari.

On 7 June 2018, he returned to Serie B after three seasons in Serie C, signing with Livorno.

On 17 January 2019, he returned to Siracusa on loan until the end of the 2018–19 season.

On 20 July 2019, he joined Sicula Leonzio on loan.

On 25 June 2021, he joined Piacenza on a two-year contract.

References

External links
 
 

1995 births
Living people
People from Syracuse, Sicily
Footballers from Sicily
Italian footballers
Association football defenders
Serie B players
Serie C players
Serie D players
Catania S.S.D. players
S.S. Akragas Città dei Templi players
Siracusa Calcio players
U.S. Livorno 1915 players
A.S.D. Sicula Leonzio players
Piacenza Calcio 1919 players
Sportspeople from the Province of Syracuse